The Aston Martin Vanquish is a high-performance grand tourer introduced by British luxury automobile manufacturer Aston Martin in 2001 as a successor to the Aston Martin Vantage (1993).

The Aston Martin "V12 Vanquish," designed by Ian Callum and unveiled at the 2001 Geneva Motor Show, was produced from 2001 to 2007 as the flagship of the marque. A concept car, known as "Project Vantage" and the first Aston Martin design wholly designed by Callum, was built to display the company's vision for a future sports car that could represent Aston Martin's aspirations after the discontinuation of the Virage-based Vantage. The concept car evolved directly into the V12 Vanquish, and featured an advanced carbon fibre and alloy structure, Aston Martin's most powerful V12 engine, and host of new technologies.  A specially modified V12 Vanquish was driven by James Bond in the 2002 film Die Another Day. In 2004, a mildly updated version of the first-generation model named "V12 Vanquish S" was introduced featuring a more highly tuned engine and more track-oriented ride and handling. The V12 Vanquish was indirectly replaced by the DBS after 2007.

The second-generation "Vanquish" was introduced in 2012, this time based on Aston Martin's existing VH platform - similar to the one that underpinned the DB-9.  Designed by Marek Reichman and made in the Gaydon facility, the VH platform Vanquish was designed to fill the shoes of the discontinued DBS V12.  In 2017, a "Vanquish S" with a more powerful engine and improved aerodynamics was launched. The second-generation Gaydon Vanquish was succeeded by the DBS Superleggera in 2018.

First generation (2001–2007)

V12 Vanquish (2001–2005)

The Aston Martin V12 Vanquish was styled by Ian Callum and drew inspiration from the DB4 GT Zagato, projecting a more aggressive presence than Callum's DB7 Vantage. The production car closely resembled the Project Vantage Concept which debuted with a V12 engine at the North American International Auto Show in January 1998. Underneath, the V12 Vanquish car featured a unique and bespoke bonded aluminium composite chassis with a carbon fibre backbone developed in partnership with Lotus, an advanced independent suspension, and a more highly tuned version of the naturally aspirated  Aston Martin V12 engine that had debuted in the DB7 two years earlier. It was available in 2+0 and 2+2 seating configurations and came only in a coupé body style. 

It is controlled by a drive-by-wire throttle and driven by a 6-speed automated manual transmission. The Vanquish model debuted with  drilled and ventilated disc brakes with four-piston calipers, ABS, with electronic brake distribution. The interior featured full instrumentation, advanced electronics, and a choice of leather upholstery with metallic details – the latter was an intentional move away from the wood trim seen in the DB7.

As Aston Martin's flagship car for the era, the V12 Vanquish was designed to deliver new performance benchmarks for the company. In addition to delivering impressive figures including an acceleration of 0– in under 5 seconds and a top speed exceeding , the first-generation V12 Vanquish was generally very well received by the motoring press. Road tests included near-universal praise for its powertrain, chassis, advanced engineering, and design. The V12 Vanquish was described without caveat as "The ultimate Grand Tourer" by Road & Track magazine.  Car and Driver described the V12 Vanquish as "worthy of the marque's heritage and a serious alternative to the top Ferrari."  

The V12 Vanquish series would become the last all-new model to be made in Aston Martin's Newport Pagnell facility. While the traditional craft techniques had evolved somewhat from those used to make the previous generation of cars, primarily in the panel shaping, there was still a great deal of work done by hand in assembly and finishing as each car was very time-consuming to manufacture. As such, the Vanquish represents both the end of an era as the last model assembled at Newport Pagnell, and the beginning of another with its forward-looking engineering and performance.  

Its appearance in the 2002 James Bond film Die Another Day earned the V12 Vanquish the number three spot on the list of Best Film Cars Ever, behind the Minis from The Italian Job, and the DB5 from Goldfinger and Thunderball. In the movie, James Bond receives this car from Q for his mission to Iceland to see Gustav Graves' presentation of Icarus after being reinstated by M and would eventually use the car once more to chase Zao and rescue Jinx. The vehicle is equipped with a variety of gadgets which include machine guns and missiles on the grille, tire spikes for snow use, an ejector seat that enables the car to go back up, target seeking shotguns, as well as a cloaking device rendering the car invisible. The V12 Vanquish is the only Aston Martin car loaded with gadgets in the Pierce Brosnan James Bond era as the franchise's deal with BMW expired following The World Is Not Enough. It is also the last gadget loaded modern day Aston Martin car to appear in the James Bond franchise until the Aston Martin DB10 which appeared in Spectre, though it wasn't loaded with much gadgets. Because of this, the first two Bond films that starred Daniel Craig had an Aston Martin DBS V12 which wasn't loaded with gadgets, though the one that appeared in Casino Royale had a compartment that carried Bond's pistol and a defibrillator. The car also appears in the video games namely Project Gotham Racing, Need For Speed: Hot Pursuit 2, James Bond 007: Nightfire, and James Bond 007: Everything or Nothing. In its appearance in Nightfire, the car is equipped with missiles, a smokescreen device, and could also transform into a submarine equipped with torpedoes. The V12 Vanquish was recognized, along with the DB4 GT Zagato, as one of the ten most beautiful cars of all time. The V12 Vanquish also appears in the 2003 Italian Job remake, where it is driven by Steve Frazelli, the film's main antagonist.

V12 Vanquish S (2004–2007)

The Aston Martin V12 Vanquish S debuted at the 2004 Paris Motor Show, with a number of subtle styling revisions. Visual changes included new wheels, a slightly different nose shape, a new raised boot lid with a larger integrated spoiler incorporating the third high-level brake light (in the rear window on the original Vanquish), a Vanquish S badge on the boot lid (the original Vanquish had no rear model designation), and the addition of a small front splitter.

The V12 Vanquish S also incorporated the features of the optional Sports Dynamic Package (available for the Vanquish for the 2004 model year), which included stiffer suspension, revised steering, and larger brakes –  front discs with six-piston calipers and  rear discs with four-piston calipers. The V12 Vanquish S was sold for the 2005 model year for alongside the original Vanquish, and 2006 onward as a stand-alone model.  The 2007 model year V12 Vanquish was not sold in the United States.

Special editions and one-offs

Vanquish S Ultimate Edition 
The end of the Vanquish's production run was celebrated with the Vanquish S Ultimate Edition. Aston Martin announced that the last 50 cars built would have a new 'Ultimate Black' exterior colour, upgraded interior, and personalised sill plaques.

Vanquish Zagato Roadster 
The Vanquish Zagato Roadster is a right-hand drive, two-seat, open-top roadster initially shown by Zagato at the 2004 International Geneva Motor Show as a prototype and based on the V12 Vanquish. It was then displayed by Zagato at the 2004 Pebble Beach Concours d'Elegance where an American collector acquired the prototype. The car had to be flown back to Italy as it was only on temporary import papers before being properly imported to the US by a Massachusetts Aston Martin dealer as a "show and display" car. The car was offered at a Bonhams auction in Carmel in August 2015 at the Quail Lodge and Golf Club with an estimated price of US$700,000–850,000. The car had been driven 13,000 miles. The car's VIN is SCFAC13391B50PP19.

Vanquish Bertone Jet 2 
The Vanquish Bertone Jet 2 is a 2-door shooting brake shown by Bertone also at the 2004 International Geneva Motor Show. The car gets its name from the 1960 Aston Martin DB4 GT Jet also built by Bertone. The car was originally shown in silver in 2004 and in gold in 2013 again at the International Geneva Motor Show at the reveal of the Aston Martin Rapide Bertone Jet 2+2.

Vanquish 25 by Ian Callum Design 
In September 2019, Ian Callum Design (the company started by Ian Callum, the designer of the first generation Vanquish) publicly revealed the Vanquish 25. It is a restoration package for the first generation Vanquish to "make the Vanquish the Grand Tourer for the 2020s,". Only 25 cars will be made by British company R-Reforged. The 5.9-liter V12 has been tuned to now make an advertised 580 hp, a 60-hp increase over a Vanquish S. The car can be had with the original six-speed, single-clutch Speedshift automated manual, a six-speed GM-sourced torque converter automatic, or a six-speed manual conversion already offered by Aston Martin Works.

Technical specifications

End of production 
The production of the V12 Vanquish ended on 19 July 2007, coinciding with the closing of the company's Newport Pagnell factory after 49 years of operation. Despite ongoing enthusiasm for the original V12 Vanquish and V12 Vanquish S, the hand made nature of their construction limited production to levels commensurate with earlier cars assembled at Newport Pagnell.

Second generation (2012–2018)

Project AM310 Concept (2012)
The second-generation Gaydon-built "Vanquish" (the "V12" part of the name was dropped for this generation of cars) started life as the Project AM310 Concept and was unveiled at the 2012 Concorso d'Eleganza Villa d'Este held on the shores of Lake Como, Italy. The concept car was based on the latest generation of the VH platform that had debuted in the DB-9, and then evolved into the V8 and V12 Vantage, DBS, Virage V12, and Rapide. It was internally known as project VH310. Aston Martin later announced that the concept would be put into production as the all-new Vanquish.

Vanquish (2012–2018)

The exterior styling of the Vanquish is an evolution of the DBS with many styling cues such as the elongated side strakes being inspired by the One-77. The boot lid included an integrated rear spoiler designed to look as if it is impossible to make; this was done on the orders of the then Aston Martin Chief Executive, Dr. Ulrich Bez. The car has an exposed carbon fibre side skirt showing its all carbon fibre body. The Vanquish uses the VH Generation III platform (VH310) which is lighter and stiffer than the VH Generation II platform used in the DBS.

The car featured a new interior with details inspired by the one found in the exclusive One-77. The standard interior was upholstered in hand stitched leather and Alcantara and was available in a range of colours. The centre console has a updated infotainment system aconmpared to the one found in the DBS. The car was available as either a 2-seater or 2+2.

Like the DB-9 and other VH platform Aston Martin automobiles, the engine is front-mounted with the transmission in the rear for better weight distribution. It uses a fully catalysed stainless steel exhaust system with active bypass valves. The 2012–2014 cars use an updated ZF Touchtronic II six-speed automatic gearbox, which was then further replaced by an updated ZF Touchtronic III eight-speed automatic gearbox starting with the 2015 model year. It was the first Aston Martin model to be available with launch control. The combined space of cabin and a boot that, at 368 litres, is more than 60% larger than that of the DBS.

The braking system uses ventilated carbon-ceramic discs,  six-piston callipers in the front and  four-piston callipers in the rear. The suspension is a lightweight aluminium front subframe with hollow castings with independent double wishbones incorporating anti-dive geometry, coil springs, anti-roll bar, and monotube adaptive dampers in the front and independent double wishbones with anti-squat and anti-lift geometry, coil springs, anti-roll bar, and monotube adaptive dampers in the rear. It has a three-stage adjustable adaptive damping system including normal, sport, and track modes. The tires are Pirelli P Zeros, 255/ZR20 in the front and 305/30 ZR20 in the rear.

The Vanquish was unveiled in the London Film Museum, Covent Garden, followed by the 2012 Monterey Car Week. Deliveries to UK and Continental Europe began in late 2012.

In August 2014, Aston Martin revealed technical modifications to the Vanquish.

Vanquish Volante (2013–2018)

In 2013, Aston Martin unveiled a convertible variant of the Vanquish, called Volante. The Volante has a full carbon fibre body, triple-skin lightweight fabric roof, 50% larger boot than its predecessor and the third generation Brembo 398 mm × 36 mm (front) and 360 mm × 32 mm (rear) Carbon Ceramic Matrix (CCM) brake discs with six-piston front and four-piston rear brake callipers. The Vanquish Volante is 13% torsionally stiffer than the outgoing DBS Volante.

The Volante was unveiled at the 2013 Pebble Beach Concours d'Elegance. Deliveries to Europe began in late 2013, with deliveries to the US starting in early 2014.

Vanquish S (2017–2018) 
On 16 November 2016, Aston Martin announced the new Vanquish S model. The car's deliveries started in December 2016. Aston Martin also unveiled a convertible version of the Vanquish S called the Vanquish S Volante in 2017.

Technical specifications

Special editions

Vanquish Centenary Edition (2013) 

The Centenary Edition is a limited edition of the Vanquish limited to 100 units commemorating 100 years of the Aston Martin company, unveiled at the 2013 Geneva Motor Show. Changes include unique graduated paint finish, solid sterling silver Aston Martin wing badges with tailored 'trans flux' enamel inlay, a special Aston Martin hallmark, leather interior upholstery from Aston Martin One-77 with contrasting silver stitching, a silver thread embroidery of the Aston Martin wings in the head restraints, solid sterling silver sill plaques individually numbered with an Aston Martin hallmark, a unique presentation box containing a number of exclusive gifts to mark the first 100 years of the company (two glass keys, two bespoke key pouches made from leather matching the car's interior trim, solid silver cufflinks featuring the Aston Martin script, solid silver Rollerball pen, Bang & Olufsen headphones, and a silver polishing cloth).

Vanquish Volante Neiman Marcus Edition (2013)

The Neiman Marcus edition is a limited edition of the Vanquish limited to 10 cars named after the US department store Neiman Marcus. Based on the US market Vanquish Volante, the bespoke features of the car are designed by the company's bespoke customisation arm; Q by Aston Martin. The design was inspired by the 1969 DB6 Volante owned by HRH Prince of Wales.
The car was unveiled at the 2013 Pebble Beach Automotive Week, followed by the 2013 Los Angeles Auto Show with delivery scheduled for early 2014.

Vanquish Zagato (2017)

Aston Martin announced a limited series production of the Aston Martin Vanquish Zagato; the latest creation from its long-standing partnership with the prestigious Italian design-house Zagato. The Vanquish Zagato Concept was unveiled to great acclaim at the prestigious Concorso d'Eleganza Villa d'Este at Lake Como, Italy in May 2016. The Vanquish Zagato is available in 4 body styles - coupé, convertible, speedster, or shooting brake. 99 each were built of the coupé, convertible, and shooting brake, while a mere 28 speedsters were made, for a total of 325 cars.

Marketing
As part of Aston Martin's 100th anniversary celebration, a Vanquish was airlifted onto the helipad of the Burj Al Arab hotel in Dubai, United Arab Emirates, on 17 January 2013.

Vanquish Vision Concept
The proposed third generation concept car was unveiled at the 2019 Geneva Motor Show. It features a rear mid-engine layout, aluminium bonded chassis and a new 3.0-litre V6 engine that can develop up to 700 PS. The production car will be on the same market segment as the Ferrari F8 Tributo and McLaren 720S. The next-generation Vanquish is planned to enter production in 2023.

The model will be sold in 2024, looking similar to the Aston Martin Valhalla.

References

External links

Vanquish
Cars introduced in 2001
Coupés
Flagship vehicles
Grand tourers
Rear-wheel-drive vehicles
2010s cars